Yume Wo Katare is a ramen shop located at 1923 Massachusetts Avenue in the Porter Square neighborhood of Cambridge, Massachusetts. It specializes in Jiro-style ramen. The restaurant is known for its service concept: diners are encouraged to share their dreams and aspirations to their fellow diners after finishing their meal.

History
Yume Wo Katare was opened by Tsuyoshi Nishioka in November 2012. He had previously worked in ramen restaurants in Kyoto to support his career as a comedian, and later owned and ran five Ramen Jiro branches in Kyoto, Osaka and Kobe which he later sold to their managers before relocating to the United States in 2011. Nishioka initially considered setting up shop in Hawaii and New York City, but was disappointed by the disproportionately large number of Japanese Americans in both locations. He wanted to set up a restaurant in a location with a large student population. He flew into Boston the day after another guest at his New York hotel suggested he open his restaurant there, and decided to set up shop in Porter Square. The restaurant closed over the summer of 2013, during which it was redecorated.

For three non-consecutive days in 2014, Jorgen "Walker" Peterson, a former chemist who worked as the restaurant's manager, launched a vegan version of the ramen recipe as a pop-up restaurant which operated in the Yume Wo Katare space during lunch hours, at a time when the restaurant is closed. 

Nishioka returned to Japan in 2018, where he has since opened up outposts of Yume Wo Katare in Beppu, where he currently lives, as well as in Okinawa, training around 50 apprentices how to create Jiro-style ramen with the goal of opening dream-centric ramen shops in all 47 Japanese prefectures.

Concept

Yume Wo Katare has been described as not just being a restaurant, but a "dream factory" and a food-centered aspirational community. Nishioka was deeply affected by the suicide of a partner in the comedy troupe he once performed with in Japan, and he has since made it his life's mission to help people achieve their dreams. To that end, the restaurant offers regular "dream workshops" in addition to its culinary offerings, particularly targeting Japanese students in Cambridge to help them figure out their own life dreams and goals.

The restaurant only offers one dish: a bowl of ramen either in regular or “extra pork” (buta) sizes which vary based on the amount of chāshū, served alongside cabbage and bean sprouts, as well as options for extra fat and garlic. The ramen base is made from a tonkotsu broth that cooks for 14 hours, giving it a rich flavor, combined with a shōyu broth and hand-cut noodles. The dish itself has been described by The Boston Globe as being "porky, garlicky, hefty, [and] intense", with prospective diners waiting in line for it every day, sometimes for over an hour.

Although Yume Wo Katare is arranged like a classroom, with space for 18 diners at one time, it is known for its interactive and novel yet highly regimented dining experience. When diners are finished, they are encouraged to share their dreams with all other diners in the room, with everyone cheering and showing support. Afterward, they are graded by restaurant staff either with a "perfect", "good job", "almost" or "next time" grade based on how much of the dish is left in their bowl, with the goal of pushing people beyond what they may think they're capable of, as well as discouraging wasteful consumption.

References

External links

Official website

2012 establishments in Massachusetts
Ramen shops
Restaurants established in 2012
Restaurants in Cambridge, Massachusetts
Theme restaurants
Japanese-American culture in Massachusetts
Japanese restaurants in the United States